Georgios Kostikos may refer to:
 Georgios Kostikos (footballer, born 1958)
 Georgios Kostikos (footballer, born 1997)